The Tama-Re compound in Putnam County, Georgia (a.k.a. "Kodesh", "Wahannee", "The Golden City", "Al Tamaha") was an Egyptian-themed set of buildings and monuments established in 1993 on 476 acres near Eatonton by the Nuwaubian Nation. This was a religious movement that had a variety of esoteric beliefs and was led by Dwight D. York. The organisation was started in 1967 in New York and went through many incarnations and name changes; in 1993, the group sold their property in Brooklyn, New York and moved to the site that would become Tama-Re.

York was prosecuted for child molestation, racketeering and financial charges; convicted in 2004, he was sentenced to 135 years in prison. As part of the verdict, the Tama-Re complex was sold under government forfeiture in 2005. The property was subsequently purchased by a real-estate developer, and the structures were demolished with the assistance of the local sheriffs department.

History
On 15 January 1993, Dwight York, longtime leader of a Muslim-related religious community in Brooklyn, New York, bought the property of 476 acres on 404 Shady Dale Road for $975,000. His followers began moving in from their former headquarters in Sullivan County, New York (some had moved there in the late 1980s) and Brooklyn.

After the move, York declared affiliation with the Yamasee indigenous people, as well as a variety of Egyptian and esoteric themes, claiming that the community was descended from ancient migrants to the Americas from Egypt. York said 
"We moved to Eatonton, Georgia because we are the Yamassee, a branch of the Washitaw Moors, The Mound Builders. Our Ancestors built the Rock Eagle Mound and many others in such states as Wisconsin, Ohio, South Carolina, Louisiana, and Tennessee. This is why we chose Eatonton to live. It is close to Rock Eagle Mound."

In 1997 and 1998, Victor Greig acted as York's representative in building and zoning matters as the community developed Tama-Re. He was cited by Putnam County Sheriff Howard Sills for building without a permit and for illegally operating a nightclub in a warehouse, which was not zoned for that use. Greig was fined $45,750 in April 1998 and appealed. His fine was reduced to $2,500, but the conviction was upheld.

The organization began to hold festivals on the property, with one netting about $500,000 in cash, according to an FBI agent's testimony.

In 1999, a lawsuit was filed attempting to enforce county zoning restrictions and prevent the Nuwaubians from using the property for anything other than residential and agricultural purposes. This led to a drawn-out, bitter tug of war between the Nuwaubians and the county authorities. At the annual week-long celebration "Savior's Day" (i.e. York's birthday) in June 1999, the county padlocked the nightclub warehouse.

In 2000, a security/paramilitary group called the Royal Guard of Amen-Ra, Inc., owned by actor Wesley Snipes's Amen Ra Films, filed BATF papers to set up a security training center next to the Tama-Re compound. The Nuwaubians claimed Snipes as one of their own, though a spokeswoman for Snipes denied any connection.

New York Press in November 2000 described the constructions completed in the compound:

Not long after you're pretty sure you've gone too far, roll up and over one last hill and the pyramids are right there. There's a black one and a gold one, and a brown-faced sphinx facing the road, and a tall obelisk, and an arch-shaped gate decorated with ankhs and other hieroglyphs, through which runs a road lined with statues of mostly animal-headed deities, all brightly painted in primary colors. Farther back, up on the rise, is a recognizable one, Isis, with ebony skin and her winged arms spread. No level of expectation can dilute the surprise–you can't believe what you're seeing. Tama-Re, Egypt of the West, has that Magic Kingdom quality.

In 2001, the Religious Movements Homepage Project at the University of Virginia reported on Tama-Re:

Armed guards stand at the entrance to Tama-Re. Approximately 100 Nuwaubians live within 15 double-wide trailers within this complex. There are approximately another 400 more Nuwaubians within Putnam County (population 14,000). At this current complex the Nuwaubians have constructed an Egyptian-style village with two pyramids, obelisks, and statues of Egyptian leaders. The two pyramids are distinct in appearance and in usage. There is a gold pyramid that serves as a trade center. Within this pyramid one can find a bookstore and a clothing store. The other pyramid is painted black with colorful Egyptian symbols painted on the outside. This structure serves as a church. Within the church, loudspeakers play Egyptian chants 24 hours a day, 7 days a week.

In March 2002, the Nuwaubians finally submitted a permit application for the nightclub, now called a "fellowship hall", allowing them to use the building for the first time since it was padlocked. On 8 May 2002, the compound was raided by the FBI, ATF, and related forces from local, state, and federal departments. No shots were fired during the raid, although tear gas was used by FBI agents. Based on a lengthy investigation, authorities arrested York on charges of racketeering and child molestation, including transporting children across state lines for the purpose of sexual exploitation.

After York was convicted and sentenced for these charges, in June 2005, the property was sold under government forfeiture by the U.S. Marshals Service for US$1.1 million. About half of this money went to the Putnam County Sheriff's Department, while most of the rest was split between the FBI and IRS.

On 9 June 2005 workers began demolishing the Egyptian-styled façades. Putnam County Sheriff Howard Sills started the demolition by tearing down the front arch with a front-end loader. The land has since been entirely cleared of all Nuwaubian structures and the property was sold to a developer, who has since built a log style hunting lodge on the property. The property is owned by White Oak Plantation as of 2012.

References

External links
 Timeline of Nuwaubian Events (1993–2002)
 'Savior' in a strange land
 Nuwaubian Aerial Photography – photos of the Egyptian-themed compound in Georgia from 2002
 Nuwaubian Compound – before & after photos of the demolition of Tama-Re 20 August 2005
 https://web.archive.org/web/20050418230435/http://www.nuwaubiaholylandofthenuwaubians.com/ – with a Tama-Re slideshow

1993 establishments in Georgia (U.S. state)
2005 disestablishments in Georgia (U.S. state)
Buildings and structures in Putnam County, Georgia
Demolished buildings and structures in Georgia (U.S. state)
Intentional communities in the United States
Nuwaubianism
Pyramids in the United States
Religious buildings and structures in Georgia (U.S. state)